Chris Dave and the Drumhedz is the debut self-titled studio album by Chris Dave and the Drumhedz. It was released on January 26, 2018, by Blue Note Records.

Critical reception

Andy Kellman of AllMusic gave the album 4.5 stars out of 5 and praised the Drumhedz's performance of the album. Kellman compared the album quality to D'Angelo's Black Messiah (2014). Pitchfork gave the album a rating of 6.2.

Track listing

References

2018 debut albums
Blue Note Records albums